Aerostar is an aeronautical manufacturing company based in Bacău, Romania.

Aerostar may also refer to:

Vehicles and transport 
 Piper Aerostar, an American twin-engine light aircraft
 Aerostar Airlines, a Ukrainian business jet charter company
 Ford Aerostar, an American minivan from the Mid 1980s to late 1990s
 Mitsubishi Fuso Aero Star, a family of Japanese passenger buses

Sport 
 Aero Star, A Mexican professional wrestler
 CS Aerostar Bacău, a Romanian professional football club
 Stadionul Aerostar, a multi-use stadium in Bacău, Romania

Other uses 
 Aerostar (video game), a game for the Nintendo platform